Rawlins County USD 105 is a public unified school district headquartered in Atwood, Kansas, United States.  The district includes the communities of Atwood, Herndon, Blakeman, Ludell, and nearby rural areas.

Schools
The school district operates the following schools:
 Rawlins County Junior-Senior High School.  Its mascot is Buffaloes.
 Rawlins County Elementary School

History
It was formed in 2003 by the consolidation of Herndon USD 317 and Atwood USD 318.

See also
 Kansas State Department of Education
 Kansas State High School Activities Association
 List of high schools in Kansas
 List of unified school districts in Kansas

References

External links
 

School districts in Kansas
Education in Rawlins County, Kansas
School districts established in 2003
2003 establishments in Kansas